The Diviners is a play by Jim Leonard, Jr. It takes place in the fictional town of Zion, Indiana during the 1930s/Great Depression era. The play was originally developed with assistance from the American College Theatre Festival and originally performed by the Hanover College Theatre Group in 1980. The play later received its first professional production with the Circle Repertory Company in 1980.

Plot
The story is set in the early days of the Depression in a small southern Indiana town named Zion. Buddy Layman is a mentally-challenged boy whose sweet nature touches most people he meets. The play begins and ends with elegies spoken by two of the townspeople (Basil Bennett, a local farmer; and his farmhand Dewey Maples) describing what happened the day of Buddy's tragedy. The body of the play is the memory of the time leading to this final climactic event. The action then jumps to back to the past, with Buddy searching (divining) for water for a well on Basil's farm. Luella, Basil's wife, refuses to believe that the boy can find water.

One day a stranger and retired preacher, C.C. Showers, passes through Zion looking for work and food. Ferris Layman, Buddy's father, offers C.C. a job, and he begins working as a mechanic in Ferris's garage. Showers takes an immediate liking to Buddy and vice versa. C.C. is able to relate to Buddy in ways that most people aren't. The two become close friends and C.C. soon finds himself as Buddy's mentor and teacher. Jennie Mae, Buddy's sister, is attracted to C.C., and though he likes her, their large age difference stops the relationship.

The owner of the town's Dry Goods general store, Norma Henshaw, has her eye set on bringing an old-fashioned Christian revival to the community. The local diner owner, Goldie Short, would love to see the church rebuilt – and all the Sunday customers it would bring to her establishment. C.C.'s relationship with the people of the town changes drastically when they learn that he was a former preacher. This knowledge sets in motion a startling chain of events. Despite C.C. trying to tell Norma multiple times that he's done preaching for good, she is adamant that C.C. will rebuild the town church and bring back traditions of worship service and songs on Sundays and Wednesdays.

She leads the town in singing hymns down at the river when C.C. tries to help cure Buddy of his aquaphobia and the ringworm that has gotten into his feet, believing that he is actually baptizing Buddy. While C.C. is trying to explain to the still singing townspeople that he isn't baptizing the boy, Buddy walks further downstream, and he is pulled under and drowns. The play is bookended by the funeral of Buddy Layman, with Basil and Dewey recounting their experiences in the aftermath of Buddy's death.

Characters
Buddy Layman: A boy who has the special gift to find water. He suffers from brain damage due to a drowning accident where he lost his mother. He is very curious yet frightened when learning about different things.
C.C. Showers: A former preacher battling his own demons who befriends the boy. He and Jennie Mae have an attraction that ends as quickly as it begins due to major age differences.
Ferris Layman: Buddy's father and local mechanic. He is short tempered and hesitant to do anything that might cause his son anguish, even if it is for his own good.
Jennie Mae Layman:Buddy's patient and caring sister. She fills the maternal role of her family. She has a crush on the preacher.
Basil Bennett: A farmer who relies on Buddy's abilities and is an amateur doctor. He is the one who diagnoses Buddy's problems. He is married to Luella.
Luella Bennett: Basil's wife who doubts Buddy's abilities.
Norma Henshaw: The owner of the Dry Goods Store. She wants the church back in Zion. She thinks the preacher's arrival is a sign from God.
Goldie Short: The owner of the Dine Away Cafe. Agrees with Norma about C.C.'s arrival.
Darlene Henshaw: Norma's niece. Imaginative and charismatic. She has a rebellious streak that fights her Aunt's rules but loves her Aunt. She sneaks off to dance with Dewey.
Melvin Wilder: Basil's farmhand who helps Dewey ask Darlene out to the dance. He is older and takes Dewey under his wing. He teaches Dewey to be "suave".
Dewey Maples: Basil's farmhand. He is young and naive. He looks to Melvin as his "older brother."

Soundtrack
Because the play takes place in a religious town, much religious music is incorporated in the script and could be used as background music. Songs listed in the play include the following:
"Amazing Grace" – used during Buddy's funeral
"Rock of Ages" – used when Norma is cleaning the store
"You Are My Sunshine" – used during Buddy's foot washing
"Leaning on the Everlasting Arms" – used when Norma sees C.C. "praying" with Buddy
"Shall We Gather at the River?" – used during Buddy's drowning

Production history
American College Theatre Festival, Washington, DC, 1980
Circle Repertory, New York City, 1980
New Playwrights' Theatre, Washington, DC, 1981
Fairfield University Theatre, Fairfield, CT, February, 1982, Director: Tom Zingarelli
Mountain Avenue Theatre, Ashland OR, 2017

References

American plays
Great Depression plays
Plays set in Indiana